Cosmisoma ammiralis is a species of beetle in the family Cerambycidae. It was described by Carl Linnaeus in his 1767 12th edition of Systema Naturae.

References

Cosmisoma
Beetles described in 1767
Taxa named by Carl Linnaeus